The Rother Valley is the valley of the River Rother, of which there are at least three in England. Rother Valley may refer to:

Rother Valley (UK Parliament constituency), a parliamentary constituency in Yorkshire, named for the Yorkshire and Derbyshire River Rother
Rother Valley Country Park, a public park in the valley of the Yorkshire and Derbyshire River Rother
Rother Valley Railway, a railway taking its name from the Sussex and Kent River Rother

See also:

Rotherham College of Arts and Technology, in Yorkshire, into which the former Rother Valley College merged in 2004